Ashford is a hamlet in the South Hams district, in the county of Devon, England.

Hamlets in Devon
Villages in South Hams